The 2009 BWF World Championships was the 17th tournament of the World Badminton Championships. It was held at the Gachibowli Indoor Stadium in Hyderabad, Andhra Pradesh, India, from 10 to 16 August, 2009. Following the results of the men's doubles.

Seeds

 Markis Kido / Hendra Setiawan (withdrew)
 Koo Kien Keat / Tan Boon Heong (semi-final)
 Lars Paaske / Jonas Rasmussen (second round)
 Jung Jae-sung / Lee Yong-dae (final)
 Cai Yun / Fu Haifeng (champion)
 Mathias Boe / Carsten Mogensen (third round)
 Mohammad Ahsan / Bona Septano (second round)
 Mohd Zakry Abdul Latif / Mohd Fairuzizuan Mohd Tazari (semi-final)
 Anthony Clark / Nathan Robertson (withdrew)
 Michal Logosz / Robert Mateusiak (third round)
 Yonathan Suryatama Dasuki / Rian Sukmawan (third round)
 Choong Tan Fook / Lee Wan Wah (first round)
 Chen Hung-ling / Lin Yu-lang (second round)
 Kenichi Hayakawa / Kenta Kazuno (second round)
 Fang Chieh-min / Lee Sheng-mu (third round)
 Vitalij Durkin / Alexandr Nikolaenko (third round)

Main stage

Section 1

Section 2

Section 3

Section 4

Final stage

External links 
Results

Men's doubles